Tom Constanten (born March 19, 1944) is an American keyboardist, best known for playing with Grateful Dead from 1968 to 1970, for which he was inducted into the Rock and Roll Hall of Fame in 1994.

Biography

Early career
Born in Long Branch, New Jersey, United States, and known among friends and colleagues as T.C., Tom Constanten wrote orchestral pieces as a teenager while growing up in Las Vegas, Nevada and briefly studied astronomy and music at University of California, Berkeley, where he met future Grateful Dead bassist Phil Lesh in the summer of 1961. The two became roommates and dropped out; shortly thereafter, they enrolled in a graduate-level course taught by Italian modernist composer Luciano Berio at Mills College. Constanten also studied piano with Mario Feninger. In 1962, he lived in Brussels and Paris, met Umberto Eco, and studied on a scholarship with members of the Darmstadt School, including Berio, Henri Pousseur, Karlheinz Stockhausen and Pierre Boulez.

After briefly rooming with Lesh in Las Vegas and returning to the San Francisco Bay Area, Constanten performed with an improvisational quintet formed by Steve Reich. The group's unusual style was influenced by both jazz and Stockhausen. In a 1964 performance, the ensemble played serialism-influenced compositions by both Constanten and Lesh. Although he walked out from the performance, minimalist composer Terry Riley later allowed the ensemble to premiere In C. However, only Reich and one other member of the group, saxophonist-composer Jon Gibson, appeared in the seminal performance.

US Air Force service
Faced with the possibility of conscription amid the escalation of the Vietnam War, Constanten enlisted in the United States Air Force in 1965 as a computer programmer. Although the Air Force was deployed in southeast Asia, he was not given a security clearance after divulging his past communist sympathies and remained stationed domestically at Nellis Air Force Base near Las Vegas; while on leave, he used LSD and composed music on military mainframe computers, including the IBM 1401. By 1967, he had been promoted to sergeant. During this period, he first collaborated with the Grateful Dead as a session musician on Anthem of the Sun (1968); Constanten used several compensatory three-day passes to travel to Los Angeles to record with the band. (T.C. listed himself as a Buddhist  on his military records, so when the Grateful Dead scheduled a recording session, he declared a spurious Buddhist holiday and went to L.A.)

Tenure in the Grateful Dead
After sitting in with the band during live performances as his schedule permitted, the day after an honorable discharge, Constanten made his stage debut with the Dead as their permanent keyboardist on November 23, 1968, at the Memorial Auditorium in Athens, Ohio. He later remarked that "it was a case of being an Air Force sergeant one day and a rock & roll star the next." He remained with the group for three albums and left by mutual agreement after the band's infamous New Orleans drug bust following a January 30, 1970 show at the Warehouse. "It was like a magic carpet ride that was there for me to step on," he says. "I would have been a fool not to." Although Constanten nominally replaced founding keyboardist Ron "Pigpen" McKernan, the latter musician stayed on with the band as a frontman-percussionist; in light of their mutual abstinence from psychedelics, they became "as close as two heterosexual males could be," shared a house in Novato, California, and bunked together while touring.

While he had successfully contributed to their complex experimental music, his instrumental style was then grounded in classical technique and bore little consanguinity with the folk, blues, and country and western stylings that would largely anchor the band's oeuvre throughout the early 1970s. Although he performed with a full panoply of keyboard instruments (including piano and harpsichord) on 1969's Aoxomoxoa, Constanten initially played a double-manual Vox Continental II combo organ on stage before switching to McKernan's Hammond B-3 in the spring of 1969; nevertheless, he was dissatisfied with the comparatively dulcet timbres of both instruments vis-à-vis guitarists Jerry Garcia and Bob Weir in a live performance context: "[T]heir sounds ranged from barely acceptable to cringeworthy. For another, I couldn't find a place for the sustained sound of an organ in a guitar band context—ahhh, for a piano! Furthermore, the action of an organ keyboard, electronic or not, was sufficiently different from that of a piano, which was all I'd known until then, to be an obstacle to my getting a feel for the music. Basically, I wasn't an organist. A Merl Saunders or a Melvin Seals could've stepped in... but they weren't there. As if that weren't enough, the amplification technology of the times was much kinder to guitars, with their direct pickups, than it was to pianos. All the electric keyboards available then, you might recall, represented some sort of cheesy compromise with the real thing..."

Several band members and employees felt that he did not fit in with the Dead ethos despite his longstanding friendships with Lesh and Garcia; for example, he was a member of the Church of Scientology throughout his tenure with the band and thus declined to become re-involved with LSD and other drugs. According to band manager Rock Scully, "He was so different. You know, he was like a crew cut. He was like a Marine in a prison camp full of Japanese. He was like our boss in a way. Nobody could go for the hard-wire technology of his brainpower. I was told I was too hard on him, too. But I had no beef."

Echoing Scully's sentiments, drummer Bill Kreutzmann noted in his 2015 memoir that he "got along really well" with Constanten and thought he was "a cool enough guy"; however, he felt that "[Constanten] had this thing where, for whatever reason, he would perform at rehearsals pretty darn well, but then, when we'd be in front of an audience, it was like he froze or something. He couldn't let go... [H]e couldn't trust the music to lead... [I]f you can't do that, you can't be in the band." Although Kreutzmann "felt no animosity" toward Constanten upon his departure, he did not consider him to be a "card-carrying member" of the Grateful Dead. Constanten's last concert with the Dead was on January 24, 1970 at the Honolulu Civic Auditorium in Honolulu, Hawaii, which is featured on Dave's Picks Volume 19.

Life after the Dead
After leaving the Grateful Dead, Constanten collaborated with Joe McCord, a mime who performed as "Rubber Duck." This culminated in Constanten writing the music for McCord's Tarot, a mime play based on the tarot deck that was performed at the Chelsea Theater Center in Brooklyn, New York in 1970. Although a proposed Off-Broadway run in Manhattan failed to manifest, the musicians associated with the project (including Constanten, former Country Joe and the Fish drummer Gary "Chicken" Hirsh and composer Paul Dresher) performed several shows at the Village Gate before relocating to Los Angeles, where they continued to perform as Touchstone, an instrumental rock band. During this period, Constanten worked on a proposed musical version of Frankenstein for Hair producer Michael Butler, who also considered mounting a production of Tarot. Touchstone's debut album (Tarot) was released by United Artists Records in 1972 and contained much of the music intended for the play; however, according to Constanten, "United Artists Records was cool to instrumental bands, though, so they didn’t promote the album a whole lot. The fact that the show didn’t catch fire during the New York run didn’t help. So the second album our contract mentioned (and we had material for) evaporated into the fog on the Hollywood hills."

Shortly thereafter, Constanten held a Creative Associate fellowship in composition at the University at Buffalo's new music-oriented Center of the Creative and Performing Arts during the 1974–1975 academic year. In 1986, he was an artist in residence at Harvard University. He has also taught at the San Francisco Art Institute. From 1986 to 1993, he was the house pianist for the radio program West Coast Weekend, playing solo piano and interstitial music. In 1994, he was inducted into the Rock and Roll Hall of Fame with the Grateful Dead.

Constanten continues to tour as a solo pianist. He has also played with the reconstituted lineup of Jefferson Starship as a touring member, most notably during the Heroes of Woodstock tour; several of his performances with the group are showcased in the Mick's Picks series of live albums. He has also sat in with a variety of Grateful Dead tribute bands, including Dark Star Orchestra and Terrapin Flyer. As of 2015, Constanten is a member of Alphonso Johnson's Jazz Is Dead, an instrumental Grateful Dead cover band that interprets classic Dead songs with jazz influences. After meeting Grateful Dead sound engineer Bob Bralove at Jerry Garcia's memorial service, the duo formed Dose Hermanos, a showcase for their improvisational keyboard work; since 1998, they have toured irregularly and released five albums.

Philosophy
In 2002, Tom Constanten stated in an interview:

Personal life
Constanten currently resides in Charlotte, North Carolina. In 2012, he recovered from a heart attack. On August 16, 2016, Constanten reported on Facebook that he was in the hospital with a broken neck, after slipping and falling on wet cement on August 10, while walking to the post office from his car in a heavy rain.

Discography
Anthem of the Sun (1968) – Grateful Dead
Aoxomoxoa (1969) – Grateful Dead
Live/Dead (1969) – Grateful Dead
U (1970) – The Incredible String Band
Zabriskie Point (1970) – various artists
Tarot (1972) – Touchstone
Duino Elegies (1988) – Robert Hunter
Fresh Tracks in Real Time (1989) – Tom Constanten
Alternate Versions (1989) – Henry Kaiser
OutSides (1990) – Tom Constanten
Heart's Desire (1990) –  Henry Kaiser
Sonatas by Beethoven, Schubert and Hadyn (1991) – Tom Constanten
Hope You Like Our New Direction (1991) –  Henry Kaiser
A Victorian Christmas (1991) – Robin Petrie
Nightfall of Diamonds (1992) – Tom Constanten
Morning Dew (1993) – Tom Constanten
A Victorian Noel (1993) – Robin Petrie
Eternity Blue (1994) – Henry Kaiser
Dead Ringers (1994) – Dead Ringers
Embryonic Journey (1994) – Jorma Kaukonen and Tom Constanten
Grayfolded (1994) – Grateful Dead
The Siamese Stepbrothers (1995) – The Siamese Stepbrothers
Live in Concert at the Piano (1996) – Tom Constanten
Blues For Allah Project (1996) – Joe Gallant and Illuminati
Sonic Roar Shock (1997) – Dose Hermanos
Live at the Fillmore East 2-11-69 (1997) – Grateful Dead
Fallout from the Phil Zone (1997) – Grateful Dead
Live from California (1998) – Dose Hermanos
Shadow of the Invisible Man (DVD, 1999) – Dose Hermanos
Grateful Dreams (2000) – Tom Constanten
Search for Intelligent Life (2000) – Dose Hermanos
Dick's Picks Volume 16 (2000) – Grateful Dead
88 Keys to Tomorrow (2002) – Tom Constanten
Dick's Picks Volume 26 (2002) – Grateful Dead
Bright Shadows (2004) – Dose Hermanos
Jan 29, 2004, Charlotte, NC (2004) – Dark Star Orchestra
The Complete Fillmore West 1969 (2005) – Grateful Dead
Fillmore West 1969 (2005) – Grateful Dead
Shimmy Shack (2005) – Shimmy Shack
For Rex: The Black Tie Dye Ball (2006) – The Zen Tricksters w/ Donna Godchaux, Mickey Hart, Tom Constanten, David Nelson, Michael Falzarano, Rob Barraco
Moved to Stanleyville (2006) – Tom Constanten and Ken Foust
Deep Expressions, Longtime Known (2006) – Tom Constanten
Gram Parsons Archives Vol.1: Live at the Avalon Ballroom 1969 (2007) – The Flying Burrito Brothers
Dave's Picks Volume 10 (2014) – Grateful Dead
30 Trips Around the Sun (2015) – Grateful Dead
30 Trips Around the Sun: The Definitive Live Story 1965–1995 (2015) – Grateful Dead
Fillmore West 1969: February 27th (2018) – Grateful Dead
Dave's Picks Volume 30 (2019) – Grateful Dead
Fillmore West 1969: February 28th (2019) – Grateful Dead
Fillmore West 1969: March 1st (2022) – Grateful Dead
Dave's Picks Volume 43 (2022) – Grateful Dead

Citations

General references 

 
 
 
 
 
  
 Tom Constanten collection at the Internet Archive
 Tom Constanten at deaddisc.com

External links 
 
 Official Grateful Dead Website

1944 births
20th-century American keyboardists
20th-century American pianists
American classical pianists
American male classical pianists
American expatriates in Belgium
American expatriates in France
American people of Norwegian descent
American rock keyboardists
American rock pianists
American Scientologists
Grateful Dead members
Jazz Is Dead members
Jefferson Starship members
Living people
People from Long Branch, New Jersey
People from Novato, California
Pupils of Karlheinz Stockhausen
Relix Records artists